Terai Bremond (born 16 May 2001) is a Tahitian footballer who plays as a midfielder for Vénus.

Career

Club career

Bremond started his career with the reserves of French Ligue 1 side Toulouse. In 2021, he signed for Vénus in Tahiti.

International career

Bremond represented Tahiti at the 2019 FIFA U-20 World Cup.

References

External links

2001 births
Living people
Association football midfielders

Championnat National 3 players
Expatriate footballers in France
Tahiti international footballers
French Polynesian expatriate footballers
French Polynesian footballers